Iskakov (Kazakh: Ысқақов, Russian: Искаков) is a Kazakh masculine surname, its feminine counterpart is Iskakova. It may refer to
Amiliya Iskakova (born 1995), Kazakhstani cyclist
Bulat Iskakov (born 1947), Kazakhstani politician
Gulzira Iskakova (born 1988), Kazakhstani handball player 
Murat Iskakov (born 1972), Russian football manager and former player
Nurlan Iskakov, Kazakhstani politician
Saule Iskakova (born 1972), Kazakhstan-born Russian voice actress 
Yerulan Iskakov (born 1988), Kazakhstani wrestler

Kazakh-language surnames